Gunadala railway station (station code:GALA) is an Indian Railways station in the Gunadala neighbourhood of Vijayawada, and a satellite station of Vijayawada in Andhra Pradesh. It is situated on Vijayawada - Rajahmundry section of Howrah–Chennai main line and is administered by Vijayawada railway division of South Coast Railway zone. It is an important station alongside , for devotees during the annual Mary Matha festival, celebrated at Gunadala hill shrine in the city. It is one of the 27 rural stations in the state to have Wi-Fi.

Classification 
In terms of earnings and outward passengers handled, Gunadala is categorized as a Non-Suburban Grade-6 (NSG-6) railway station. Based on the re–categorization of Indian Railway stations for the period of 2017–18 and 2022–23, an NSG–6 category station earns nearly  crore and handles close to  passengers.

References 

Railway stations in Krishna district
Vijayawada railway division